Adobe LiveMotion was a product created by Adobe Systems released in 2000 and perceived as a direct competitor to Macromedia Flash.  It replaced the discontinued Adobe ImageStyler program, which Adobe had sold from 1998 to 2000.

LiveMotion was used to create interactive animated graphics.  It was able to export to a variety of formats, including QuickTime and Macromedia Flash.  LiveMotion has an interface and motion timeline similar to After Effects and had the ability to share files across using the Adobe exchange file format.

Adobe released LiveMotion and LiveMotion 2.0 before discontinuing development November 15, 2003 because of poor sales due to fierce competition from its rival. In early 2005, Adobe and Macromedia announced that they would merge, which would likely have resulted in the LiveMotion project being scrapped anyway.

External links
 LiveMotion product page – 
 LiveMotionCentral.com - resource site for LiveMotion
 LiveMotion and ImageStyler resources at About.com

LiveMotion